Abubakar Abubakar Kabir (born 1981) is a politician, entrepreneur and philanthropist. He is a current member of the Federal House of Representatives, and the Chairman of the Committee on Works. He was elected to the House of Representatives in 2019, under the platform of the All Progressives Congress party, representing the Bichi Federal Constituency.

Education Background
He attended Hagagawa Primary School, Bichi, Government Junior Secondary School Bichi, Before Proceeding to Dawakin Tofa Science College, For his Senior Secondary School Certificate.
He Obtained a Bachelor degree in interdisciplinary studies from New York Institute Of Technology and A Master in Energy Management From same University

Political career 
Being Chairman of the Committee on Works, Abubakar Kabir has provided legislative support and checkmate to critical road projects across the country in engagement with contractors and the Ministry of Works and Housing.

He has led the committee to oversee projects such as the Lagos-Badagry Road, Abuja-Kano Road, Abuja-Kaduna-Zaria-Kano Road, Kano Light Rail Project, Eko Bridge Project.

In his jurisdiction, has delivered social and physical infrastructure, as well as donation of education support to his constituency.

The following bills have been sponsored by Abubakar Kabir in his tenure:

 a bill for the establishment of a University of Medicine and Health Sciences, Bichi, 2021
 a bill for the establishment of the Office of the Surveyor-General of the Federation (Establishment) Bill, 2021.

References 

Living people
Nigerian Muslims
Nigerian politicians
People from Kano State
1981 births